Al Jazeera Investigative Unit formerly, Al Jazeera Investigates, the outward facing name for journalists from Al Jazeera Media Network's Investigative Journalism Directorate.

The Investigative Unit 
The Investigative Unit has bureaux in Doha, London and Washington DC. It was formed in 2012 when Al Jazeera decided to create a specialized team whose sole mission was to generate breakthrough content. The I-Unit describes itself as producing "original journalism that disrupts the global news agenda. Its mission is to speak truth to power by exposing wrongdoing while acting in the public interest."
Clayton Swisher became the I-Unit's first director following the success of The Palestine Papers  and an investigation into the death of Yasser Arafat. In 2018, the former BBC reporter and filmmaker Phil Rees took over the unit. I-Unit investigators generate exclusive content for platforms within Al Jazeera Media Network. This material is presented in multiple languages, visual and audio media, ranging in duration from 30 seconds to two hours. The I-Unit's documentaries have won over forty awards and in December 2019, it began its own podcast, series, Al Jazeera Investigates.
Notable investigations that made global headlines include Pakistan's Bin Laden Dossier, The Spy Cables, Inside Kenya's Death Squads, The Dark Side, The Lobby, Cricket's Match Fixers, How to Sell a Massacre, and Anatomy of a Bribe. The I-Unit operates under the codes and practices of Britain's Office of Communications, Ofcom, the United Kingdom's government approved broadcast and telecommunications regulator.

Awards and nominations
44th Graham Perkin Journalist of the Year Award – Journalist of the Year Award  – Nominated

Broadcast Award - Best News and Current Affairs Programme  – How to Sell a Massacre – Nominated

WALKLEYS  -  Investigative Journalism / Scoop of the Year – How to Sell a Massacre  –  Winner – Investigative Journalism – Nominated / Scoop of the Year

FPA AWARDS - TV Documentary of the Year – How to sell a Massacre – Sports Story of the Year – Cricket's Match Fixers – The Munawar Files – Nominated

LOVIE AWARDS  – News and Politics – Karaoke Chemist – Gold Winner

AIB – Association for International Broadcasting - International Documentary – How to Sell a Massacre  – Winner

NMRA Kennedy Awards - Scoop of the Year / Journalist of the Year and Outstanding Investigative Journalism – How to Sell a Massacre / Peter Charley – Winner

DIG AWARDS - Long Investigative –  Generation Hate EP2 – Nominated

Headliner Awards -  Cricket's Match Fixers – The Munawar Files – Third Place Nomination

BAFTA – Current Affairs – Football's Wall of Silence  – Nominated

Banff World Media Festival – Rockie Awards – Crime and Investigative – Generation Hate – Nominated

New York Festival TV & Film Awards – The Oligarchs – Current Affairs – Gold – The Oligarchs – Business / Finance – Gold –  Football's Wall of Silence – Current Affairs – Gold –  Football's Wall of Silence- Sports – Gold – Islamophobia – Current Affairs – Gold

Islamophobia – Religious – Silver –  Cricket's Match Fixers – Current Affairs – Gold –  Cricket's Match Fixer – Sport – Silver

British Sports Journalism - Television Sport Factual or Feature – Football's Wall of Silence – Nominated

Broadcast Award – Best News and Current Affairs Programme – Football's Wall of Silence  – Highly Commended

AIB AWARDS - Investigative Documentary – Football's Wall of Silence – Highly Commended

Wildscreen Festival – Panda Awards – Documentary – The Poacher's Pipeline – Nominated

See also
 All the Prime Minister's Men
 The Lobby (TV series)
 This is Only the Tip of the Iceberg

References

External links
 Al Jazeera Investigative Unit Official site
Al Jazeera Investigative Unit Twitter page
Al Jazeera Investigates The Podcast 

Al Jazeera English original programming
Al Jazeera America original programming
2006 television series debuts
English-language television shows
Documentary television series
Current affairs shows